Ralph C. Starkey High School is a high school in Circleville, Ohio.  It is a part of the Circleville Juvenile Correctional Facility.  All youth prisoners who do not have a high school diploma are required to participate in the educational program.

References

External links
 Correctional Facility Website

High schools in Pickaway County, Ohio
Public high schools in Ohio